WAMN is a classic country formatted broadcast radio station licensed to Green Valley, West Virginia, serving Bluefield in Virginia and Bluefield and Princeton in West Virginia.  WAMN is owned and operated by West Virginia-Virginia Media, LLC.

Programming
Until late 2011, WAMN was an affiliate of ESPN Radio when they switched to a Classic Country format.  The station continues to carry sports programming from the Marshall Thundering Herd football and basketball radio network.

Translator

Previous logo
 (WAMN's logo under previous 97.3 translator)

External links
Willie 94.5 Online

Classic country radio stations in the United States
AMN
Radio stations established in 1987